Joanne Lynda Gardner (born 25 March 1997) is an English cricketer who currently plays for Warwickshire, Sunrisers and Southern Brave. She plays as an all-rounder, bowling right-arm medium and batting right-handed. She has previously played for Northamptonshire, Loughborough Lightning and Oval Invincibles.

Early life
Gardner was born on 25 March 1997 in Newport, Isle of Wight. She attended Loughborough University.

Domestic career
Gardner made her county debut in 2011, for Northamptonshire against Derbyshire. She scored 2 runs and bowled 7 overs for no wicket. 2013 was a breakthrough year for Gardner, as she took 15 Championship wickets at an average of 14.26, as well as taking her maiden five-for, with 6/21 against Oxfordshire. In 2014, was the leading wicket-taker across the whole Championship, taking 19 wickets at an average of 9.47. She took 5/23 against both Scotland and Hampshire. She hit her maiden county half-century in 2015, against Leicestershire, and went on to hit three more in 2016, and was the leading run-scorer for her side in both competitions.

In 2017, Gardner joined Warwickshire. She hit 54* in her first match for her new side, in a 2 wicket victory over Kent. Gardner was part of the Warwickshire team that won the 2019 Women's Twenty20 Cup.

In 2021, after playing in the Twenty20 Cup for Warwickshire, Gardner went on loan to Essex for the Women's London Championship in order to play 50-over cricket. 

Gardner was also part of Loughborough Lightning's squad in the Women's Cricket Super League in 2018 and 2019. She played one match in 2018, but did not bat or bowl. She played three matches in 2019, including the semi-final, and took two wickets. 

In 2020, Gardner played for Sunrisers in the Rachael Heyhoe Flint Trophy. She appeared in all 6 matches, and was her side's leading run-scorer and joint leading wicket-taker, with 193 runs and 7 wickets. She scored one half-century, 54, in a losing cause against Western Storm. In December 2020, it was announced that Gardner was one of the 41 female cricketers that had signed a full-time domestic contract. Gardner played 11 matches for the side in 2021, across the Rachael Heyhoe Flint Trophy and the Charlotte Edwards Cup, taking two wickets and with a top score of 42, made off 30 balls against Northern Diamonds. She also played nine matches in Oval Invincibles' victorious campaign in The Hundred. She played eleven matches for Sunrisers in 2022, across the Charlotte Edwards Cup and the Rachael Heyhoe Flint Trophy, scoring 193 runs and taking eleven wickets. She moved to Southern Brave in The Hundred, but did not a play a match for her new side.

References

External links
 
 

1997 births
Living people
People from Newport, Isle of Wight
Alumni of Loughborough University
Northamptonshire women cricketers
Warwickshire women cricketers
Essex women cricketers
Loughborough Lightning cricketers
Sunrisers women's cricketers
Oval Invincibles cricketers